"Crying Out for Me" is an R&B song from Mario's third studio album Go, which was released on December 11, 2007 and is the second
official single. It was produced by Polow da Don and written by Amber Rives and Jasper Cameron. The song has been listed for 15 week in the Billboard Hot 100. Its first appearance was week 50/2007 and the last appearance was week 12/2008. Its peak position was number 33, where it stayed for one week. Its highest entry was number 97. The official remix features rapper Lil Wayne another one features rapper Busta Rhymes, but are not included on the single or album Go.

Critical reception
Mark Edward Nero from About.com stated that the song "is the Usher sound-alike jam"

Aaron Fields from KSTW.com said "I really like this track produced by Polow da Don. It's a smooth track about the classic subject...woman is being done wrong in her current relationship in which Mario sings to her, "I can hear your heart, crying out for me". Great vocals, great beat and definitely a great choice for the second single".

Music video
The video was directed by R. Malcom Jones, Costume Designed by June Ambrose and premiered on BET's Access Granted on September 17, 2007. In the video, the song has some alternate changes. In the beginning, Mario arrives at some place. He sees his female friend having an argument with her boyfriend. When her boyfriend walks off, Mario walks over to greet her. Her boyfriend jealously snatches her away from him and gets in his face. The girl, bruised, calls Mario from a payphone. They then go to a club. He picks her up later and she looking over her shoulder, leaves. After they embrace, Mario drives off. They get a surprise when they notice that they are being followed by the girl's boyfriend. He tries to run them off the road but ends up crashing, killing himself, is similar to the end scene in Justin Timberlake's video "What Goes Around...Comes Around". They get out to investigate and see that he is dead. The girl tearfully turns to Mario and he comforts her.

Track listing
Crying Out For Me (main)
"Crying out for Me" (radio edit)

Crying Out For Me [SINGLE]
 Radio Edit (4:10) 
 Instrumental (4:18) 
 Call Out Hook (0:10)

Crying Out for Me (Piano Vocal, Sheet music) (Sheet music)
Piano Vocal Artist
Mario Sheet music

Charts

Weekly charts

Year-end charts

Certifications

Notes

2006 songs
2007 singles
Mario (singer) songs
J Records singles
Song recordings produced by Polow da Don
Songs written by Polow da Don
Songs written by Jasper Cameron